Pedro Cardoso may refer to:

Footballers
Pedro Miguel Cardoso Monteiro, Cape Verdean footballer known as Pelé
Pedro Gonçalo Gonçalves Mesquita Cardoso, Portuguese footballer
Pedro Cardoso (footballer), for Rocha F.C.; see 2006 Liga Deportiva Universitaria de Quito season

Others
Pedro Cardoso (Brazilian actor) (born 1962)
Pedro Cardoso (cyclist), in GP Internacional Paredes Rota dos Móveis
Pedro Cardoso (poet) (1890–1942), Cape Verdean writer, poet and folklorist